Yatran Berestivets is a Ukrainian women's football club from Uman Raion.

History
Founded in 2008 as Yatran Uman and competed for several seasons until 2011. It withdrew from the league competitions. With revival of the Persha Liha (First League), the second tier, in 2013 the team resumed its participation as Yatran-Umanfermash. Originally set to have a single team for promotion, Yatran-Umanfermash lost the final game against Medyk Morshyn. Nonetheless, for the 2014 season Yatran was admitted to the Vyshcha Liha (Higher League).

In August of 2020 it was announced that the club withdrew.

References

External links
 Profile. UEFA.com.

Football clubs in Cherkasy Oblast
Ukrainian Women's League clubs
2008 establishments in Ukraine
Association football clubs established in 2008